Elections for the London Borough of Merton were held on 3 May 1990 to elect members of Merton London Borough Council in London, England. This was on the same day as other local elections in England and Scotland.

The whole council was up for election and the Labour Party gained overall control of the council from the Conservatives with a majority of one seat.

Background

At the last election, the Conservatives had gained a majority of one seat. In October 1989, they lost a by-election in Merton Park to Bridget Smith of the Merton Park Ward Residents Association, which had contested the by-election in opposition to the proposed extension of the A24 relief road. This by-election result hung the council, but the Conservatives continued to govern Merton as a minority administration.

This was the first whole council election which was contested by the MPWRA.

Results
The Conservatives lost their one-seat overall majority of the council to Labour, who themselves gained a one-seat overall majority of the council. The Merton Park Ward Residents Association won all three seats in Merton Park from the Conservatives; they have since maintained these seats in subsequent elections.

In Durnsford, incumbent Conservative councillor and future Conservative Prime Minister Theresa May topped the poll. This was the last election she contested in Merton.

Ward Results

Abbey

Cannon Hill

Colliers Wood

Dundonald

Durnsford

Figge's Marsh

Graveney

Hillside

Lavender

Longthornton

Lower Morden

Merton Park

Phipps Bridge

Pollards Hill

Ravensbury

Raynes Park

St. Helier

Trinity

Village

West Barnes

Notes and references
Notes

References

1990
1990 London Borough council elections